John M. Lioufis served as the Commissioner of the Greek Scouts in Egypt.

In 1978, Lioufis was awarded the 127th Bronze Wolf, the only distinction of the World Organization of the Scout Movement, awarded by the World Scout Committee for exceptional services to world Scouting.

References

External links

Recipients of the Bronze Wolf Award
Year of birth missing
Scouting and Guiding in Egypt
Scouting and Guiding in Greece
People from Alexandria
Egyptian people of Greek descent